Qatar–Russia relations are the bilateral foreign relations between the two countries, Qatar and Russia.

Background

Soviet-era relations
Following Saudi Arabia's lead, Qatar refused for many years to have diplomatic relations with the Soviet Union. This changed in the summer of 1988, when diplomatic relations between the two states were established on 2 August. The Soviet Union opened its embassy in Doha on 12 November 1989, and Qatar opened its embassy in Moscow on 14 November 1989.

Russian Federation relations

Diplomatic ties
On 26 December 1991, Qatar recognised the Russian Federation as the successor state to the Soviet Union, after the latter's dissolution. Russia has an embassy in Doha, and Qatar has an embassy in Moscow. 

The current ambassador of Qatar to Russia is Fahad bin Mohammed Al-Attiyah, who appointed his Letters of Credence to Russian President Vladimir Putin on 16 March 2007.

Political ties

Relations became strained after Zelimkhan Yandarbiyev was assassinated in Qatar on 13 February 2004. On the third anniversary of Yandarbiyev's death, Russian President Vladimir Putin traveled to Qatar on a state visit, where he was received by Emir of Qatar Hamad bin Khalifa Al-Thani.

On November 29, 2011, Russian Ambassador to Qatar, Vladimir Titorenko, was allegedly assaulted by Qatar airport security and customs officers when he refused to have his suitcase scanned at the airport. 
Relations again became strained on February 7, 2012, when reportedly, after a diplomat from Qatar warned Russia of losing the support of Arab League about upcoming resolution on the Syrian uprising, which Russia and China later vetoed, the answer came harsh from Russian UN ambassador Vitaly Churkin who replied that If you talk to me like that, there will be no Qatar today and boasted about Russian military superiority over Qatar. Later, Russia denied all these accusations.

Economic ties
In 2010, the Russian state-owned Yamal Reindeer Company began producing canned, halal reindeer meat for export to Qatar. Production commenced at the direction of the governor of the energy-rich Yamalo-Nenets Autonomous District, who proposed it during a meeting with Qatari officials.

During a visit to Doha on 12 February 2007, Russian President Vladimir Putin signed an agreement to establish the Russian-Qatari Business Council.  As of 4 December 2018, the Chairman of the council is Ahmet Palankoev, a Russian businessman.

References

External links

  Documents on the Qatar–Russia relationship at the Russian Ministry of Foreign Affairs

Diplomatic missions
  Embassy of Russia in Doha

 
Bilateral relations of Russia
Russia